This is a list of boundary changes occurring in the London region of England, since the re-organisation of local government following the passing of the London Government Act 1963.

Administrative boundaries

Adjustments permitted by the London Government Act 1963
Greater London was created by combining whole existing units of local government and it was anticipated that this might provide an arbitrary boundary in some places. The London Government Act 1963 Section 6 (4) provided a mechanism for communities on the edge of Greater London to petition for transfer to a neighbouring county. The legislation required the petition to be submitted between 1965 and 1970, to be signed by more than 300 local electors and for the area to be transferred to have no more than 10% of the borough's local electors. These were completed in 1969 as the transfers of Knockholt to Kent, and of Farleigh and Hooley to Surrey. Section 6 (3) of the act allowed for transfers between Greater London and neighbouring counties where there was consensus for the change between all the relevant local authorities. This power was used to exchange two islands on the River Thames that were connected to the river bank by bridges on the opposite side of the river to their respective counties. Thames Ditton Island was transferred to Surrey from Greater London and Platts Eyot was transferred the other way.

Principal Area Boundary Reviews
The Local Government Boundary Commission for England (or LGBCE) was established by the Local Government Act 1972 to review the administrative boundaries of every local authority in England. Between 1974 and 1992 they completed a series of Principal Area Boundary Reviews; reviewing the administrative boundaries of local authorities at their request.

Mandatory Reviews of non-Metropolitan Counties, Metropolitan Districts and London Boroughs
In 1985, they began the first full administrative review of all non-metropolitan counties. Their reviews of metropolitan counties and Greater London began in 1987 and both reviews were completed in 1992.

† = also altered the boundaries of the Metropolitan Police District

Other mandatory meviews of non-metropolitan counties, metropolitan districts and London boroughs
Report No. 627: The Boundaries of Greater London and the London Boroughs May 1992

The table below summarises the overall changes in area and population.

Electoral boundaries

First periodic review
The Local Government Boundary Commission for England (or LGBCE) was established by the Local Government Act 1972 to review the electoral boundaries of every local authority in England. In 1973, there were early reviews of the electoral boundaries of Bexley and Kensington and Chelsea which needed minor boundaries redrawn in time for the 1974 local elections. In 1974, they began the first full electoral review of all metropolitan and non-metropolitan districts, completing it in July 1980. Their reviews of the county councils were completed in 1984.

Second periodic review
The Local Government Act 1992 established the Local Government Commission for England (or LGCE) as the successor to the LGBCE. In 1996, they began the second full electoral review of English local authorities. After the 1998 Greater London Authority referendum held on 7 May 1998 resulted in a yes vote, the LGCE drew the electoral boundaries for the new Greater London Authority and London Assembly. On 1 April 2002 the Boundary Committee for England (or BCfE) took over the functions of the LGBCE and carried on the review, completing it in 2004.

Further electoral reviews by the LGBCE
The Local Government Boundary Commission for England (or LGBCE) was established by the Local Democracy, Economic Development and Construction Act 2009 on 1 April 2010 as the successor to the BCfE. It continues to review the electoral arrangements of English local authorities on an ‘as and when’ basis.

Proposed changes
In 2004, following a poll, a move was mooted by the London Assembly to entirely align the Greater London boundary to the M25 motorway. In 2005, then Mayor of London, Ken Livingston, suggested that Dartford, Thurrock and Watford could be given the opportunity to vote on inclusion in Greater London in local referendums although these never took place. In 2010, it was suggested that an extension of the boundary to include Elmbridge was being considered.

References

History of local government in London
Boundary
Greater London